Tyco US-1 Electric Trucking was a slot car line made by Tyco Slot Cars from 1981-1985. It’s theme was based around over the road and construction heavy-duty diesel trucks. It was marketed under the tagline of "You Control The Action!"

How it works 

The system was originally designed to be operated from a 6.9V DC supply, this later increased to 7.9 V DC. Both were at 2.0VA.

(The transformers enclosed in overseas sets suited the local supply and plugs, but often had different output voltages). 

Transformers were supplied with the sets, but the vehicles can be safely worked from most modern conventional model railroad transformer/controllers, if the original US-1 control gear is not used.

The trucks run on a gray variant of the Tyco Quick Clik track that provides power to the vehicles through two thin metal strips in the track, which is similar to many other HO scale road and racing systems. The track was initially produced with yellow center lines and some other markings, although this is less common and most track was supplied unmarked.

Two types of trailing turnouts were made that allowed the vehicles to pass through unimpeded and then, if required, reverse back into a siding to access an Action Accessory. These junctions consisted of a sprung copper tongue that extended across the slot, interacting with the front and rear guide pins. A switchable Hi Adventure junction was supplied in the GI Joe set which would allow vehicles to travel in either direction without being automatically directed into a siding.

The Action Accessories were each supplied with a plastic joining clip that fitted under the end of the track and consisted of two arms that slipped beside and firmly held the rounded 'build-outs' on either side of the turnout track, which made the accessory attachment very secure.

Various combinations of track sections were supplied in the sets, except the 45 degree 12" radius curves, which were only sold separately and are hard to find. Other rare track pieces include the two different versions of the 9" double turnouts that only appeared a few sets and the Railroad grade crossing.

Longitudinal copper pick-up shoes span almost the entire length of the chassis, which transfer the power to the motor. The pick-ups were held in by screws and could be replaced, although some later vehicles are known to have rivets instead of screws. The motor itself is a universal clip-in type that uses a worm screw to turn a worm wheel on the rear axle. These worms and gears were originally brown, (possibly Delrin or Tufnol) but on most vehicles they are a white nylon-like plastic. The white gears are sometimes found to have cracked with age, but the earlier brown ones all seem to remain intact.

At the front and back of the chassis, guide pins keep the truck on the track, allowing it to go in reverse. Guide pins were originally brown plastic blades mounted on a wedge-shaped base, but later and most commonly, round metal pins were used. On most chassis there are two raised angled strips molded on either side of the guide pin mount, which stopped the original plastic guide blades rotating. Comparatively few chassis are without these. The actual pin mounting never changed and either type of pin can be fitted to any vehicle.

The rear axle has removable rubber tires, which will harden over time and consequently lose grip. These occasionally require replacing. However, the front axle, the extra axle on the three six-wheeled vehicles, all the axles on the trailers (and even those on the dummy Firebird) had hard plastic tires that run freely and with hardly any drag. Only the Fire Truck, Wrecker and the vehicles on the higher Stomper chassis had rubber tires front and rear.

Each vehicle carries two weights - a flat plate at the front and a block at the rear with a tunnel to clear the worm gear. On the Trruck Cab, Semi-trailer truck (or Tractor unit) the rear weight was black and cast in the form of a Fifth-wheel coupling where the trailer was attached. These give the vehicle more traction and help it to pass through the sprung junctions, which can cause lighter (non US-1) vehicles to stall.

The front weights later gained a small raised arrow to show the front to aid assembly. The plain rear weights gained one too, but this time it was added onto the front edge so that it protruded towards the motor bearing when inserted. The other prominent feature of the plain rear weights is the mold number. The black fifth wheel mounts have one too, but this is out of sight on the underside between the mid flaps.

Most of the Truck Cabs (or Semi Tractors) have a cast fifth-wheel type weight with a 'blind' or closed-off pivot hole, where the trailer attaches. However, on some this hole is open and the gear mechanism can be seen inside. It is thought that this variation exists on the earliest vehicles produced. The open-hole variation does not affect how the fifth wheels work with the trailers.

The Wrecker and the Fire Truck both carried flashing lights, the latter carried a bell, too. These were mechanically activated by a geared drive taken off the rear axle. Despite those features being added, the core chassis inside these two vehicles were the same as all the others in the range except the Stompers, which used a bespoke deeper chassis molding to accommodate the lower reach required by the pickups, which was necessary because of the higher tires.

Operation of the accessories is done automatically, usually by contact with the truck or trailer. However, in the case of the crane, bulldozer, and airport, the accessory is operated by the vehicle's drive wheels acting on a roller, (as it continues to be powered in reverse, whilst pushing against a stop block).

Since this was a roadway system instead of a race track, the controllers were not hand-held, but were intended to resemble the dashboard of a truck. Originally separate and attached to the track via some wires, each controller had a steering wheel (to control the speed) and a switch mounted to the side (to control the direction).

The first type of controllers are known to exist both with and without the yellow lines on the road surface. The output from the transformer was plugged directly into the terminal rail attached to the two controllers.

Later these individual units were simplified so the steering wheel did both speed and direction. By this time yellow markings had stopped being applied to the road surface.

The final type of controllers came as one twin unit in the form of a single box, attached to a molded base on the side of the track and these also only had two steering wheels, which were mounted side by side. The transformer connection now plugged directly into the control box instead of the track. 

Controllers are usually red but the twin versions in the G.I. Joe and Stomper sets were molded in green.

Vehicles & Trucks 

The core chassis of all vehicles are of the same basic design throughout the range, (with only the Stompers using a different chassis molding) but there were many body types and different colors.

There were two types of truck cabs modeled: One a Peterbilt conventional, the other a Kenworth C.O.E. (cab over engine). Both types had four wheels and were made to pull Semi-trailers in box, tank, flatbed, auto transporter and hopper varieties, using their exposed metal rear chassis weight which was also the Fifth-wheel coupling.

All other vehicles except the wrecker and fire truck had plain rear chassis weights, which were hidden by the vehicle body.

There were three six-wheeled Peterbilt trucks: dump truck (or tipper), troop carrier and a Wrecker. On these, the extra axle was mounted under the body assembly.

Other vehicles included a Mack Fire Engine, Police car, taxi, Pickup truck, Dodge delivery van, ambulance, Jeep, and a Pontiac Firebird Coupé. The Firebird appeared in both powered (black color with gold eagle) and unpowered (white with black eagle) form, the latter for towing by the wrecker. The dummy car had a plastic chassis with a metal clip to help engage the jib of the wrecker.

Body Colors were generally molded in pre-colored plastic, although the earliest known version of the Green and the Red Dump Truck, the Yellow/Orange and Red/White Strip Peterbilt Truck Cabs were molded in white plastic and given a painted finish. The same is true of the Mack Fire Truck, Airport Taxi, Goodyear Tires pick-up truck, Black Firebird and even the Police car, which was painted all over white before the blue panels, etc. were added. After-market re-sprays of models are becoming more common, which are sometimes offered for sale on Internet auction sites.

The Wrecker and Fire Truck and a number of Peterbilt trucks were made with working lights. These had a small bulb soldered to the two motor contacts. On lit Peterbilts this nested in a recess within a clear plastic molding that plugged into the front grille and some openings in the cab roof. This also served as glazing in the cab windows.

The clear plastic transmitted the light from the bulb to the two rectangular headlights on either side of the grille, two round lights in the bumper and an array on the cab roof. These lights lit up when the vehicle was travelling.

The radiator molding used on lighted trucks differed from the unlit ones as the rectangular headlights were left open, where normally they would be solid and in chrome finish like the rest of it. A similar molding to the clear one, but in dark plastic was also used in some trucks without lights, which makes them look as though they have heavily tinted windows!

Lighted versions of the following trucks are known: Peterbilt Truck Cabs: Yellow with Orange and Black Stripes, Red with White Stripes, Black with Gold Stripes, Yellow with Red Stripes. Peterbilt Dump Trucks were also advertised with lights in the common Green, White with Brown and Orange Stripes and ‘Dept of Highways’ in Red and Black, however, others are known such as the all over Red (Painted finish), Blue cab with the Yellow bucket and Blue cab with Silver bucket.

The Lighted Green Dump Truck and the Lighted Red Peterbilt Truck Cab (with White stripes) were only supplied in two sets ('Day & Night Haulers' and 'Cross Country Day and Night Set').

Vehicles - Changes & Variations 

Dump Trucks
Over the years, a number of changes were made to the Peterbilt Dump Truck moldings. Following the release of the initial painted versions, production switched to pre-colored plastic and a small ridge appeared lengthways in the middle of the rear of the dump bed, where the tailgate rested when shut. This ridge did not last long and was removed by the time the tail gate gained a bottom lug and matching receptor in the bucket to aid more secure closing. At the same time, the originally round hinges became oval to allow the extra travel needed to open and close it.

The final change to the dump bed was changing the tail gate to a fat 'T' shape, with 'stubs' added at the top on either side and the hinges were enlarged again and made thinner to accommodate these. 

Peterbilt Truck Cabs
From around 1983, Peterbilt Truck Cabss and Dump Trucks both acquired an oval 'Peterbilt' logo on the sides of the hood and the front of the Radiator. The name "Peterbilt" can be clearly seen with a magnifier. Finally, when the Dump Truck chassis was adapted with extra slots to take the troop-carrier body for the GI Joe set in 1984, the opening above the motor was changed from a square to a T shape.

So far none of the "common" green Dump Trucks have been found with the Peterbilt Logos, the final type of tailgate or the chassis modifications for the troop carrier attachment. A red Dump Truck with the logos and final type of tailgate is known.

Similarly, none of the common Truck Cabs (yellow with orange and black stripes, or unlit versions red with white stripes) have been found with the logos, but the lighted version of the Red Semi with white stripes, can be found both with and without the Peterbilt logos. This tends to suggest that there may have been over-production of some vehicles early in the life of the range and it took a while to sell them.

Kenworth COE
The Kenworth C.O.E. (cab over engine) type Truck Cab also later gained the Kenworth name in small writing on each cab side just forward of the front mudguard. It seems both the later racing cabs (with chromed plastic fifth wheels) have this and most of the US-1 series Truck Cabs can be found both with and without.

So far no Army Green version has been found with the lettering, one theory being that the change was made after the Army set was produced. 1985 is a date suggested for the change.

Stomper
Although the Stomper Blazer enjoyed a very short life, variations are known: Test-shot moldings exist that include a clear plastic light bar, although no light bar has ever been found fitted on production models in this series, nor was any US-1 Blazer ever fitted with lights. The headlights on the body shell are just open round holes. Early bodies were supplied fitted with a pair of thin weights, secured sandwich-like, at the rear of the body, by two plastic prongs, melted over to hold them in place.

Flat Bed Trailer
The flat-bed trailer comes in two distinct variations. The rear panel is either completely smooth or has a 6mm-long ridge across the bottom. All the different color versions of the flat bed can be found both with and without this feature. The ridge appears to have been added later as it also appears on a small number of hopper trailers. 

Box Trailers
All post-US-1 Box trailers have the 6mm long ridge described above too. So far no tank trailers are known with this.

There were lots of color and detail variations. For example the 'Benskins' box trailer can have a plain white or plain gray base, or come with a white base with round black circles painted at the base of the support legs - presumably to resemble small tires?

Lots of other trailers including Gravel trailers can be found with this detail, which is thought to be on early versions and quickly discontinued to cut costs.

On the 'Allied' box trailer the number '1' appears in a shield on the diagonal white line of the road that rises towards the front of the trailer. One some this shield appears at a disappearing angle, so that it appears flat on the surface of the painted road. On others it appears to face towards the side of the truck so that more of the number can be viewed.

The 'Smith's' Box trailer is known with either a silver or plain gay base. Some silver bases  are known with the black circles (mentioned above) painted on the base of the bottom of the legs.

Tank Trailer
Recently an unusual version of the Exxon tanker trailer has surfaced. These are normally silver with the Exxon name applied in red over the silver, followed by a red stripe where the words "Happy Motoring" appear in white. On the newly discovered version the red stripe starts before the word ‘Exxon’ which is in red on a white background, after which the stripe continues as before with the ‘Happy Motoring’ in white. It is not yet known whether this variation appeared before or after the more common one.

Action accessories 
There was a wide variety of these made over the years, they were supplied in sets, but most could be bought separately as well. Some were based on designs that were originally part of the Tyco model railroad range. A full list appears later, but they are each worth describing in detail.

There was a small brown Gravel Unloading bin designed to sit under a length of single track that had a small oblong opening and a flat billboard at the end, where a single green 'Gravel' sticker was applied facing the track. The rear side was heavily reinforced by two half-round molded pillars. As the gravel trailer was reversed into this, a raised portion of the roadway engaged with and opened the shutter underneath the trailer, causing the gravel to fall through the opening and into the bin.

This special track was later modified, gaining a box with raised sides around the opening, presumably to prevent spillages. Meanwhile, two long slots were also added on the sides to enable it to lock over the front of the gravel hopper to form the 'Elevated Gravel Unloader' (see below). At the same time, the billboard at the end was made double-sided, by removing the reinforcing ribs at the rear, so that it could now take a green and white 'Gravel' sticker on each face.

The brown gravel bin was originally supplied with a tan-painted floor, discontinuing that was probably an early cost-cutting measure.

To fill the gravel trailer, there was an orange Operating Overhead Gravel Hopper that stood on a gantry over another type of single-road section (this was also used under the Barrel Loader). As the gravel trailer was reversed under the hopper it opened a shutter and was filled with gravel, ready to be driven away. This hopper was supplied with a small billboard-type 'Gravel' sign that attached to the front of the hopper by two prongs. These are quite vulnerable and today are nearly always found broken. Adhesive putty can be used to mount billboards with broken prongs on the frame of the orange hopper. This is where it was often shown on the set box illustrations - (See Tyco Truck Resource link below).

The same hopper could be used as part of the Elevated Gravel Unloader which consisted of two sets of Elevated Piers (including three of the largest size), and a later version of the section of track supplied with the Gravel Unloading bin. This time that unloading track was intended to be positioned above the hopper, making it possible to fill the gravel trailer, drive around the circuit and then put that same gravel back in the same hopper ready to do it all again. The instruction sheet enclosed has a diagram showing how to arrange the track to achieve this, including where to position all seven graduated-height Elevated Piers.

The Gravel Supply Terminal was a 'dock' where a gravel trailer could park. There was a small brown building with a black roof at the far end. Although there was no loading or unloading here, a neat little mechanism allowed the Truck Cab to reverse in and automatically hitch or un-hitch the trailer as required. This mechanism was later simplified. See details in the Freight Terminal below.

The same dock-molding was used for the Freight Terminal where one of the Box Trailers could be parked, which worked in the same way. This had an even smaller yellow hut with a gray roof at the far end. The number of parts in both the gravel terminal mechanism and the freight terminal were later reduced and the openings for the 'prongs' at the front were closed.

Original US-1 gravel was made of small plastic pellets and was supplied in a sealed clear plastic packet, but is often lost. Mung Beans look similar and make a perfect replacement.

Crates – These are sturdy-looking objects which were set out on a gray platform outside a cream shed with a low opening. This was the Crate Loader. As the flat trailer was reversed in, it pushed the platform back into the shed but the doorway was too small to allow the crates in, so they slid onto the trailer.

The Crate Unloader is a light gray platform at one side of a single track with a small yard on the other. Access was through a tall dark gray hoop from which a hinged flap is hanging. The ominous yellow and black hatchings and the words ‘Unload Here’ are a clue to what happens – the trailer loaded with crates is reversed under the flap, which hinges open away from the main road, allowing the trailer and crates to pass beneath, but as the trailer is withdrawn, the flap locks vertical and rigid, then brutally tears the crates from the trailer onto the floor, irrespective of any ‘Fragile’, ‘Handle With Care’ or ‘This Way Up’ stickers that might be applied to them.

In the Army Transport set this Action Accessory became an Ammunition Dump, with different stickers and darker brown crates. A Stars & Stripes flag was included on the sticker sheet, so the set may have been sold with a Tyco Racing flag pole. The set box shows the flag and pole mounted on the far inside corner of the platform but an unloading bay with a hole for fitting it in has yet to turn up. This tends to suggest that the tooling was probably never modified.

Replica crates have been produced, most recently as 3d printings. If originals or replicas are unavailable, a 1" wooden cube suffices.

Car Loader – Similar in principle to the crate loader, a double-deck red hollow ‘cartridge’ is loaded up with the four brightly colored automobiles – two on each level. The yellow car trailer reverses against the cartridge, moving it back against a tall red stop block. This causes the four cars to roll forward and fill the two decks of the trailer.

Car Unloader This is a long roadway with an orange gantry leading to two ramps. As the Auto Transporter trailer reverses in, it engages with the gantry, causing the decks to rise at the cab end, encouraging the cars to roll out of the trailer, onto the ramps and finally come to a rest, spread out on the black cardboard Parking Lot that is part of this item.

Logs - These were brown-stained 9-mm-diameter wood dowels 1.5 inches long and could be loaded into the dump truck by the Log Loader/Elevated Log Loader, which held the loading device high on a red girder gantry. The loader is designed to clip under the side wall of the track to hold it in the correct position.
The girder base was wide enough to support both the loader and the accompanying track. 
The loader can also be removed from the girder base and used at ground level. The actual loading part consisted of a sloping tray in which the logs are laid. This has a lever that is activated by the dump truck reversing alongside. This releases one log at a time into the bed of the dump truck. The actuating lever is quite fragile and many found today are broken or missing. The lever tends to strike most larger passing vehicles when the loader is clipped in place.  It is rare to find these in operating condition.

Operating Log-Loading Bulldozer is a mechanical accessory of the type for which Tyco were famous. The bulldozer is activated by the motor of the Dump Truck that is being loaded. This is transmitted to the mechanism by rollers. Once the truck was reversed in, it rested against a stop block. The power is kept on, causing the bulldozer to push the logs up a gentle slope and into the body of the truck. There is a male driver figure wearing a blue uniform who drives the bulldozer. He is prone to breakage or being lost altogether as he has a very loose connection to the driver's seat. Once the logs have been loaded and the truck has left, the bulldozer needs resetting by hand and the stock of logs, replenishing. 

Recently a 3d printed modification has been made that allows the bulldozer to automatically travel back and start again.

Logs are often missing but dowelling of a suitable thickness (8mm-diameter adequately substitutes the original 9mm size) can be cut to length and stained in a commercial wood stain, or even tea or coffee, to look much the same as the originals.

Much confusion has been caused by the Bulldozer accessory base being shown on the box as being 'the other way round to what is supplied'. This has been made worse by a pre-production model appearing in catalogues, which was also the wrong way round. In practice all the production versions of US-1 Bulldozer accessories were the same way round regardless of whether they were sold separately or in sets. An example of a production version is illustrated in the 'List of action accessories and tracks' section.

Boulders - There is an identical Boulder Loading Bulldozer which came with some boulders (these are actual small stones not imitations) instead of logs. This is much less common than the log-loading version and seems to have been introduced later. Today suitable replacement stones can be obtained from hobby stores. Tumbled and glazed ones reduce friction and avoid scuffing the surface of the accessory.

Pipes - The Operating Crane Pipe Loader was another mechanically activated accessory borrowed from Tyco model railroads. The drive was the same as the bulldozer but activated a yellow crane with a rigid wire hook in the shape of an 'L' to move in a back and forth, up and down movement. As it moved, it scooped up a pipe and deposited it in the rear of the waiting truck which supplied the power. It continued in the same movement while the power was applied. The pipes were 14mm-diameter wide white plastic tubular moulding, in 10 mm lengths. These were held on edge in a narrow sloping trough, molded into the base, presenting their open side ready for the crane to engage. As one was taken, the next rolled into place ready for the crane to swing back. The crane did not need any manual intervention, other than more pipes being added when they ran out. Pipes, like logs and gravel are often missing but 15-mm-diameter plastic water pipe cut into 10 mm lengths makes a perfect substitute.

The US-1 Crane was always yellow with the words ‘General Construction co’ on the sides of the cab on red. On early versions just the word ‘General’ was red, whilst the other words were black. The red crane from the model railroad range can be interchanged with the yellow one.

Barrels are 13 mm in diameter, 19 mm long, and have one end sealed. They are usually molded in off-white plastic, but were dark butter yellow in the Army Transport set (with wrap-around yellow 'Diesel' stickers) and white in the Stomper Set. The same barrel-molding was used as a load for a brown slat-sided semi-trailer in the TYCO TCR series, although in a luminous yellow plastic.

These were held in the Barrel Loader - a brown sloping rack mounted on a yellow girder frame. As the tipper truck reversed, it engaged with a lever that released some barrels, which rolled from the rack into the truck. A version with a blue sloping rack and the same yellow frame was shown in publicity material and on the carton of the Motor City set. All examples found have the same brown loader as all the others, but with Motor City Oil Co. stickers with blue writing on a white background. As yet, no substitute barrels have been found, but a 19mm-long, 13mm diameter pipe or dowel would probably suffice. However, an Internet vendor has recently advertised new old stock Tyco barrels in bright yellow and glow in the dark green on their web site.

There were two varieties of unloading yards; the more common Pipe and Log Unloading Yard, which had a grey base and brown walls. This was sold separately, as well as being in most sets, and also appeared with blue walls in the 3209 Motor City Set. The blue unloading yard is labeled with Goodyear stickers and according to catalog illustrations was intended to receive tires, although a way of loading them was not devised. In the Army Transport Set, the standard brown-walled Unloading Yard became an Army Dump with different stickers.

The second smaller Unloading Yard arrived later and is much harder to find. It is on a 9" 45 degree double turnout supplied in the 3219 Night Haulers Set and later versions of the 3208 interstate delivery set. Originally this track was just a double turnout in the 3213 Highways Wrecker Set, but a small unloading yard with brown walls was added on one side of the junction and most of the double turnouts to be found have this. Curiously, the rounded 'build-outs' (for engaging with joining clips) remained on either side of the track leading to the yard when the modification was done, clearly showing that this track was originally intended to be a double junction.

The Unloading Yards worked by the lip at the entrance of the yard engaging with the 'steps' or 'mud flaps' on the rear of the reversing Dump Truck's bucket. This causes it to rise, the tailgate to open and the goods to slide out into the yard. Logs, pipes, barrels, tires and presumably boulders could all be deposited in the unloading yards but not gravel, simply because the rear of the tipper was too large to go under the elevated hopper.

The mechanical Airport accessory lacks any loading or unloading function. The rollers transmit the drive from the vehicle to the orange radar dish on a white cap, which rotates atop the terminal building. Attached to the inside of the cap is a long, rigid wire. On the far end of this is a small plastic plane, which resembles a Cessna 310. As the radar revolves in an anti-clockwise direction, the plane circulates the tower, soaring up and coming back down, over and over again, almost landing and then taking off. There is a cardboard mat supplied for the building to stand on which includes a short section of runway.

This is popular at shows, causing gasps and wows as the plane appears to fly. There are two planes provided and they are both rather small for the scale of the trucks and the buildings. One of them is in FedEx livery, so a good vehicle to use with this would be the FedEx delivery van or the Airport Taxi, whilst the Peterbilt Truck Cab shown on the box looks rather out of place.

The radar dish is fragile and often broken or missing. The walls are blue and the windows lined in white with the word 'Airport' on the blue roof in big white letters. This was mainly sold as a separate item but appeared in one set (in this form), the 3225 Coast to Coast Set.

The Airport appeared again with brown walls and a gray roof, as the Forest Rescue center in the very rare 3211 Stomper Set. This time the radar and cap were molded in butter yellow and the plane has simpler decoration to allow for the application of the Red Cross stickers and Forest Rescue markings.

The G. I. Joe Satellite Launcher consisted of a two-piece sculpted concrete effect launch pad area with a straight approach track at the center of one side. The base unit for the pad was clearly derived from the 3440 Unloading Yard.

The pivoting launching gantry folds down horizontally, in line with the roadway, in order to engage with a missile loaded on a flatbed trailer as it is reversed towards it. In this position the launch gantry engages with the hollow missile and as the trailer backs further the gantry pivots to bring the missile to the upright position. Missiles are normally white with a gray cap but a few rare examples are known to have red caps.

The gantry is a very delicate white plastic molding and many found today have broken pivot arms. It is a great shame that there was not more than one batch of this set produced for as we have seen earlier, Tyco never held back on making 'improvements' where they identified a design fault or weakness. It is a miracle that any of these launchers have survived unbroken at all and today all will need handling very carefully. This accessory was exclusive to the GI Joe set and was never available separately.

The Pick Up Track for Disabled Car was another item that could only be obtained in a set, but this was exclusive to 'Highway Wrecker'. It is a short single straight track with a switch on the side to permit the Disabled Firebird to be picked up or dropped off. At the far end was a phone booth made of two oblong triangular plastic moldings that joined together to form the shape around which stickers were applied.

The Pick Up Track is rare and highly sought after, commanding ridiculous prices on Internet auction houses, where they turn up surprisingly often. However, this track was accompanied by an orange Billboard that carries an orange and red 'Shell Road Service' poster in the form of a sticker. This is molded in one piece with a solid representation of the latticework supporting the narrow platform in front of the poster, which features an image of the US-1 Wrecker. This billboard is extremely hard to find and rarely turns up, however the same molding in a similar color appeared carrying an advert for Pasta in a 1983 Tyco Model Railroad Chef Boyardee promotional set.

Garage type buildings appeared in different colors, with different signs to serve as three differently purposed buildings, all with road access:
 Highway Wrecker Set with Lighted Wrecker, Tow Car & Garage; the building was yellow with an orange roof and petrol pump. There also a special piece of single straight track with switch that allowed the towed car, the White Firebird, to be unhitched as it was reversed in to the opening.
 Fire Station with Switch Track & Storage Yard; a red version of the building with a black roof. This came off a different track section that formed a tuning-fork shape. The Fire station stood over the right lane, whilst the left lane was open. As a vehicle drove in to one lane, the turnout automatically switched to the other, isolating the first vehicle. There was a representation of a siren on the roof of this building, which looks a bit like chimney.
 Garage with Switch Track & Truck Stop; this was similar to the fire station, but had white walls, a blue roof, red windows, etc. It had the same track section as the fire station and operated in the same way. There was no siren or petrol pump.

 Flashing Danger Track  came with a 15" straight squeeze track where one lane moved towards the other to avoid a hazard. This made it impossible for two vehicles to pass simultaneously. There is a red beacon with a flashing light that sits at the side of the road warning oncoming vehicles. This accessory requires two AA batteries.3673 Overhead Interstate Highway Signs were sold in packs. These contained six gray over-road lattice gantries that each had two blank sign panels and sheets of different stickers to apply to them. They were also supplied in every US-1 set, including the Stomper Set with some special labels, including one for a Stomper Garage. Most of the stickers provided relate to the various action stations: Log Loader 3 Miles Ahead, Dump Site, Motor City Car Lot, Freight Terminal, Gravel Terminal, Gravel Hopper, Oil Refinery, etc. (There was never an Oil Refinery Action Station). The stickers have a tendency to dry out and fall off over time, even those still on the sticker sheet. The gantries are highly prone to breakage, due to their flimsy nature and skinny legs. They are also prone to yellowing. The Highway signs are often missing from sets, probably because they have become broken, or even discarded. When being used they can obstruct the cleaning of the contact rails or attending to a vehicle.
 
The earlier gantries have a clearance height of 60 mm from the ground and have 35 mm long flat feet on either side intended to be tucked under the track. These are not very effective at standing up and are too low for the loaded car transporter to pass beneath. The later type of gantries have a 70 mm clearance from the ground and the feet are only 25 mm long, but each has a wedge shape projecting against the side of the track. The newer design clips positively against the track and usually remains there whilst is high enough to allow a loaded car transporter to pass freely underneath.3768 Overhead Highway Light is a unique little gray streetlamp, set on a gray rectangular base that houses a single AA battery. It is operated by an on/off sliding switch. The bulb is mounted in the head with a reflector behind. These are surprisingly effective for Day and Night Sets. These are rare and hard to come by in working order.US-1 Elevated Piers, although never sold separately, the light gray piers appeared in four of the trucking sets and were a key part of the '3453 Elevated Gravel Unloader' action station. A set of piers included two of each. Pier 1 is 19mm or 3/4" high, number 2 is 38 mm or 1 & 1/2" and pier 3 reached a height of 57 mm or 2 & 1/4". In the top of each pier was an 11mm-diameter round hole that engaged with the corresponding round lugs on the underside of most lengths of US-1 Track.  

Besides the piers, elevated items in the US-1 series included the 'Elevated Gravel Unloader' which required the track to be at 73 mm from the base and the 'Elevated Log Loader' which needed it to be at 76 mm high. The US-1 piers are the same as those sold to use with Tyco Quick Clik racing track and were in some of the earlier Tyco 'Command Control' and later 'Tyco TCR' Slotless sets too, although these were often cream instead of light gray and often with slots either side of the central hole to ease fitting. The shape of the pillars (a gently tapered series of progressively smaller concentric oblongs), goes back to the Tyco Pro series of track, although the top fixings of those were not compatible with US-1 or Quick Clik.

Although sold for potential use with an HO-scale model railroad, the US-1 elevated track has a clearance of 57 mm provided by the high-level piers, which is insufficient to clear a train running below. This is made worse if a roadbed-type model railroad track is used, where the track sits on some imitation ballast, raising the height of the rails by several mm.

57 mm is also too low to allow a loaded car-transporter to pass underneath. However, as the elevated piers are hollow, it is possible to stack them upon each other, to give the extra height required, provided enough can be found. It is still possible to obtain packs of brand-new unused (old-stock) Tyco piers on the Internet. One layout seen on a well known popular video app has a high-level circuit supported by 87mm high pillars which have been created from three of the middle-rise piers firmly stacked together. This height suffices to clear an HO Railroad on a roadbed-type track, as well as any US-1 road circuit running a loaded car transporter.

Interestingly, Tyco did also make two different height extenders - One a red bespoke shaped 'Bridge Foot' and a cream rectangular block that can only be fitted onto the foot. These both originated with the earlier 'Tyco Pro' series track but the red bridge foot was sold well into the Quick Klik track era and is in lots of sets. The standard pillars will fit on top of both items, which are each also 19mm or 3/4" high. Using these it is possible to raise your track to 76mm or 3" and 95mm or 3 & 3/4" high.GuardRails Otherwise known as 'Crash Barriers' - These were only supplied in the Stomper Set, (which contained 6), or in pairs in packs of the 90 Degree 9" Radius Curves. Those included in the Stomper set were brown, whilst the ones sold with the curves were yellow like those used with Tyco Racing Series. They all clipped to the edge of the roadway sections.

There were also three Plastic Construction Kits: a Mobil Truck Station, a Howard Johnson's Truck Stop, and a 'P.I.E. Freight Terminal', each molded in several colors to be glued together. These were supplied by Pola, in what was then West Germany and were also sold for a time as part of the Tyco model railroad range, but in plain Tyco 'Brown Box' packaging, sometimes with slightly different colorings or markings or with lights. The Howard Johnson was also sold by IHC, whilst the Truck station and Freight Terminal kits have appeared in other ranges over the years and are still available, but now as part of the Walther's Trainline range and with different colorings and markings.

 Sets 
Most US-1 pieces came together in a series of sets, based on certain duties a truck would need to do with various action accessories as described above. Some sets were themed, such as the 3235 Road & Rail set, with a complete railroad and two of the No. 3727 road and rail crossing sections, or the 3217 G.I. Joe High Adventure Set, based around soldiers and their equipment.

The vehicles supplied in the sets were but a small selection of those available: The Peterbilt dump truck appeared in most sets (except the G.I. Joe, Highway Wrecker and Stomper Sets) - usually in the standard lime green, but was olive green especially for the army transport set, was blue an yello in three others  and it is thought to have been red in the rare Empire set.

The Peterbilt truck cab was also included in most sets, (except Army Transport, Fire Alert and Stomper Sets) the colors being red with white stripes or yellow with orange and black stripes (both are consequently common colors for this vehicle). It was in Army green in the GI Joe set.

The Kenworth truck cab was only sold in two sets - appearing in blue with stripes in the Fire Alert set, whilst the olive version was exclusive to the Army Transport set. 

In the Day and Night Haulers set and the Cross Country Day and Night Set, the green dump truck and the red Peterbilt truck Cab were both lighted versions. The Fire Engine, introduced in the Fire Alert Set, was also lighted, with a flashing light and working bell as it travels the track.

Other vehicles that featured in sets include the following: Wrecker, Dummy Firebird, Stomper Blazer, Stomper Pick Up and the Cobra Troop carrier which was only available in the G.I. Joe set.

The G.I. Joe set also came with soldiers, tanks, jeeps, a helicopter, a boat, a bridge, paratroopers, a die-cut Secret Cobra Command Headquarters, a full-color G.I. Joe Action Battle Mat (with Mountain Backdrop) and a unique Satellite Launching Pad with Gantry Action Accessory.

Tyco issued a Schaper Stomper-theme Set that was only produced in 1985. It contains a special version of the Airport in brown (3434), unique to this set. A die-cut cardboard building can be folded to make a garage for the cars. The set sits on a Stompers-themed playmat, with a portion of the track supported by Elevated Piers.

The 3213 Highway Wrecker Set, released in 1984 is also highly desirable. This set contains a gravel loader, gravel unloader, garage, double turnout, special Pick Up Track for Disabled Car with phone booth and billboard sign. 

Notes on a few of the sets: Although the Interstate Delivery Set name was re-used, the contents of 3206 and 3208 were different. Set 3219 is widely known as Night Haulers, but an instruction sheet uses the title Day and Night Haulers. Additional sets were made after 1986, which used similar layout configurations of earlier versions, with minor changes to the layout and changing types of Action Stations. Some large retail companies even added their own marketing twist on the original versions by adding bonus action stations, and adding a prefix to the set, such as a "P" (P3210Q) for JCPeneny or "S" for Sears (S3311), etc. These sets were often sold in plain white TYCO boxes with no art work.

 List of action accessories and tracks 

Some notes on track numbering: The number molded on the underside of US-1 track is often misleading because most sections of US-1 track were just a gray variant of the Quick Clik black racing track. Some items can be found with a racing and US-1 reference underneath - the Squeeze track and the Lane Changer for example, but even then the number molded is usually a part number rather than a catalogue number. For example the bespoke 9" Turnout carries the reference 3016 beneath but was listed as 3700. Most separate track appears to have been sold in pairs in carded blister packs except the 9" Turnout and the railroad crossing which were individually sold in blister packs and the squeeze track which was sold with the flashing Warning Sign in an illustrated box.

We have listed the special and rare 'set only' items of track in the table above by their molded numbers, to help identify them.

There were several different Assortment Packs advertised in the annual catalogs. These contained substantial quantities of track, and other items such as Street Lamps or Overhead Signs. The contents and reference numbers changed over time, but the packs always appeared to contain three transformers and three controllers, which seems rather odd. It is not known how these were packaged and they were never shown on retail price lists, so they may have been aimed at dealers.

Boulder Loading Bulldozer - Two reference numbers have come to light for this item: 3414 is shown on literature enclosed with the accessory, whilst 3470 appears in the 1984 and 1985 Tyco catalogs. Both are shown above.

 Tyco US-1 Catalogues and literature or "It Ain't Necessarily So" 
The US-1 range first appeared in the joint Tyco racing and model railroad catalogue in 1981 and was then shown every year until 1986. It featured in a number of other promotional leaflets, too, as well as magazine advertisements, etc.

One big issue for the collector is the accuracy of how the range was represented in some of those illustrations and also the images on the various set and accessory boxes. The set boxes also carried large artist's renderings of other makes and types of trucks and trailers that didn't appear in the range. How things were illustrated was not necessarily how they actually appeared when sold.

The first example of this is the track with yellow center lines. This was produced only briefly, but was still being illustrated in catalogues several years later. Some of the images of the assembled set contents showed yellow lines throughout their time in the range, although this wasn't the case.

The second issue is of prototype or pre-production models being shown instead of the final version. This is particularly true of the crate unloader, gravel hopper, gravel bin, bulldozer, and pipe loading crane illustrations, some of which are clearly not the versions actually produced, all differing in several details. The one still causing most confusion is the Bulldozer which was shown in catalogs and on the box as having the base section the opposite way round to that actually supplied. All bulldozer bases were the same as the one shown in the 'List of action accessories and tracks' above.

The third example is the type of trucks shown in the various set content illustrations. In the section on lighted vehicles you will see that these were only supplied in one set. There were also clear differences between lighted vehicles and those without lights, most noticeably the two rectangular headlights either side of the grille were open instead of solid, with a clear plastic lens inside.

Upon examining various set illustrations, it is clear many of the vehicles shown accompanying some of the sets are actually lighted ones, even though these were not supplied in that particular set. Conversely it appears that some early lighted trucks were listed without them actually being identified as such. The lighted Truck Cab in Yellow with orange and black stripes appears to be one example of this.

Finally, a few items are shown in a color finish the actual items never carried. For example the top section of the Motor City barrel loader is shown as being blue, but was in reality just the normal brown version with Motor City Stickers. The US-1 Police car was a two-door Dodge Charger but at least once it was shown as a four-door Plymouth Satellite with a large blower.

So even though Tyco may have illustrated it, that does not mean it exists.

 Body Shells - before, after and outside of US-1 
The Peterbilt Truck Cab had preceded the US-1 range, being introduced in 1979 on the lighted HP2 racing chassis and a slotless, lighted Command Control chassis. The latter was black with flames and no hole in the fifth wheel - or sometimes a hole, which was too small for the later trailers.

Command Control was Tyco's first attempt at slotless racing and a direct competitor to the original Ideal Total Control Racing or TCR. The same body was later used again in the Tyco version of the Slotless TCR system produced from 1991 to 1993

Both the Peterbilt and Kenworth Truck Cab moldings were used in racing form, with a chromed plastic fifth wheel, which was initially attached by a rivet and two melted-over plastic side pegs to the platform behind the driver’s cab. On later Peterbilts the rivet was deleted and the side pegs were considered enough, although the rivet hole remained.

Two versions of the Kenworth 'Cab over' Truck Cab were available in racing form between 1983 and 1985 with HP7 chassis. One is mainly black with a red stripe with white edges and the other mainly white with blue patches and orange stripes. 

Most of the racing and slotless Truck Cab bodies can be easily adapted to fit a US-1 chassis by drilling out the hollow rivet and pegs that hold the chromed plastic fifth wheel in place. Any vehicle so modified will have three evenly spaced tell-tale holes visible on the platform just behind the cab. On some early examples of the Peterbilt Truck Cab this rear platform is lower and consequently these bodies will not fit a US-1 chassis without further work.

The Peterbilt Truck Cab bodies that won't fit on a US-1 chassis can be identified by their colors: Baby Blue with Black Stripes or White with Red Stripes. Also some in Yellow with fine Orange and Red Stripes or Black with Flames used the original version of the body as well as the later version that will fit. Some of these had gray grilles and exhausts instead of Chrome.

Of the many US-1 trailers, only the box type made it into the racing series, appearing in various color schemes. The later had a redesigned reversible bogie with a slot-guide plus a bar magnet to encourage it to stay on the track, although some are known to carry the US-1-type bogie. At the front end, these box trailers kept their US-1 style pivot, allowing them to be run with US-1 Truck Cabs.

The Dodge Van can be found in various liveries in racing form and also in Tyco TCR form as the Blue and White ‘Emergency’ Jam Car. This featured the red light-bar that had been used on the US-1 Mack Fire Truck.

Police Cars: There is a US-1 publicity photo showing a four-door Plymouth Satellite in use as the US-1 Police Car: with roof lights, a large hood mounted blower and side pipes, but this was never released as part of the US-1 range. (See the Tyco Resource in the External links section Below - Vehicles page)

The US-1 ‘911’ police car and Airport Taxi were based on the two-door Dodge Charger that had been introduced to the Tyco range back in 1977. This was done without 'door-netting' on the glazing and the body was modified to take the roof lights for the police car. The Charger remained in the Tyco racing range until 2005.

Other US-1 vehicles that can be found with a racing chassis are the Jeep in civilian colors which was available from 1980 to 1983 and the Black and Gold Firebird which was sold from 1979 to 1983 but was to eventually reappear in 2005 and 2006 in two special sets.

There are eight non-US-1 versions of the Stomper Blazer, five of which were equipped with lights, which the deeper bodied US-1 version never carried. The three 'flame paint' versions had no lights. Plain white unused Blazer bodyshells with trim are still available from one vendor on the Internet, although these lack glazing.

The Mack Fire Truck was sold as part of the Faller Auto Motor Sport range, both individually (cat no. 5631) and in the 'Feuer Alarm' set (Cat no. 3907), which also contained a lighted blue and white Aurora AFX version of the Pontiac Firebird. These were both introduced in 1983 and the truck was catalogued for at least two years. From two examples seen, it would appear to be the standard US-1 offering, with the same chassis, mechanical bell, lights and American markings. Even the molded 'Tyco H.K.' markings were underneath.

At this late stage Faller AMS had extensive links to Aurora AFX. The Fire Truck appeared in the Faller range alongside some of the same Truck Cabs and trailers which were also sold as part of the Aurora 'Big Ryder' series, (which was their answer to Tyco US-1).

 Other HO Truck Systems Aurora 'Big Ryder' & AutoworldAurora produced a series of trucks: Mostly box trailers with six wheeled Truck Cabs and were all capable of running in reverse. For a short time these were sold with a revised fifth wheel coupling as part of the Big Ryder series, along with some special box and flat trailers with folding front legs. These carried either containers or imitation Tarpaulin covered loads and could be unhitched by reversing which brought down the legs. The range was not that extensive and the loading and unloading was mostly confined to containers, with gantry cranes and fork lifts which were sourced from Lima. It is likely that further development of the range ceased due to events that overtook the Aurora company

The containers in Big Ryder appear to have originated in the Faller AMS range and may have been bought in. However all these vehicles could reverse and are capable of being run on US-1 plain track, subject to action sometimes being needed to combat the deeper guide blades fitted. The line does not seem to have been that popular when produced and tends to command very high prices on Internet auctions today.

Replicas of some Aurora Truck Cabs have appeared in the Autoworld Series, but they also made a Peterbilt Dump Truck that looks very similar to the US-1 version, but it does not tip. The non-tipping bucket is fixed on a copy of the old Aurora 6 wheeled Peterbilt chassis with an Aurora like cab. This runs on a magnetic AW T-Jet derived chassis with single pick-ups, but with guide blades at both ends to allow it to reverse. None of the Aurora or AW trucks are that happy using the US-1 junction due to them having only single pick-ups and they can’t reverse back far enough to operate the roller activated accessories, (because the rear guide is mounted too far back). However, the AW Dump Truck will collect logs from the elevated log loader and activate the barrel loader.

The guide blades fitted to AFX, Big Ryder and Autoworld models are deeper than the regular guide blades on US-1 and can bottom out in the shallower slots on non-AFX type track. Usually these vehicles come with reversible guide blades with a shorter pin for non-AFX track types. The trailers generally need guide blades to stay on the US-1 slot, but the tractors are best fitted with a pin at the front and blade at the rear.Carrera Transpo 'Trucker' was a short lived 1/60 scale system that clearly borrowed heavily from US-1. It featured a Dump Truck, a Truck Cab and trailers in both box and gravel types. Accessories made included a Gravel Unloader, a Gravel Loader and a dump yard. All very similar to the US-1 offerings. Unusually there were four contact rails in the roadway sections enabling two trucks to operate independently in both directions anywhere on the layout and change from one lane to the next. The mechanisms were of the highest quality too! Sadly, a lot of work is needed to get these lovely models to run on US-1 track and this means altering the way the models work permanently. (see below).

Recently a small number of quite interesting factory-made special versions of the Carrera Dump Truck have appeared. Documents exist showing that these models were sent as samples to Aurora in January 1983, presumably with a view to Aurora marketing a production version.

These Dump Trucks have full-length pick-ups very similar to US-1, which are made wider by having 'spoon'-like protrusions at each point of contact and will operate on most HO slot car tracks, provided that the guide pins are modified as stated below. The dump buckets on these do indeed tip and the vehicle can reverse, but the angled rake of the rear of the bucket hits the stop block before it can engage with any of the roller-activated accessories. It will however operate the barrel loader and the dump yard, but the sheer bulk of the superstructure of the vehicle causes issues with the elevated log loader.

The Carrera Trucker guide pins are wider and deeper than US-1 and these will need these will need shortening by 1/8” and some width-reduction before this vehicle can run on US-1 track and negotiate the junctions.Faller also made a few trucks in their AMS HO slot car series. Late in the range a 6 wheel rigid metal based container lorry was made. This was capable of being loaded with small ISO type Shipping container either by being backed into a loading dock or by being placed under the Faller working Container crane. Railway wagons to take the containers were also made and the crane could tranship them between road and rail. The same containers were also sold for a short time as loads in the Aurora 'Big Ryder' series.

 Spare Parts, running and collecting 
Some parts, such as pickups, were originally available from the manufacturers, but today these are hard to find. Luckily a number of people have begun producing parts to keep US-1 vehicles running. Tires which fit all the standard vehicles are available from a number of vendors. Specially stamped and shaped replacement pick-ups can be obtained too, which fit all the vehicles in the series, (including the Stompers). Recently, batches of light bars for the wrecker and fire engine have been made, along with the unique tires for the Stomper and some US-1-type metal guide pins.

The most exciting news came in early 2021 when a manufacturer announced the arrival of replica worm and gear sets, 3D printed in a tough black plastic and supplied with a tube of PTFE grease for replacing worn or cracked 35-to-40-year-old white nylon gears.

The first 3D printed replica parts for US-1 were advertised in 2020 by the same source. So far it is the often missing sign board for the ‘garage’ series of buildings, a petrol pump, tipper tailgates, pipes for the crane and bogies for the trailers. Recently a set of parts to make the bulldozer reset itself have been offered as either a purchase of download to print yourself.

The availability of many of these replica items can usually be seen on a well known Internet auction house.

The motor used throughout US-1 was a standard Mabuchi item and can also be found fitted to other vehicles, including 'Ideal' Slot Cars and slotless Ideal TCR 'Jam Cars'. New old stock spares can sometimes be found and many similar, but not identical motors were made. When checking a Mabuchi motor to see if it will be a suitable replacement, the available length of the shaft to take the worm gear and the position of the contacts (which is on the side of US-1 motors) need to be considered.

One vendor specializes in making double 90 degree turnouts out of two single ones, along with 9" and 6" single straights. The custom single-track sections are even more useful when modified with a joining clip at one end, (salvaged from a broken action accessory), and a pair of the rounded 'build-outs' (salvaged from damaged Turnouts), at the other. These changes make these track sections attach as securely as an Action Accessory. Custom track is very handy when optimizing layout in the available space.

Vendors offering trucks, trailers, loads and Action Accessories in custom finishes, such as FedEx, can often be found on a well known Internet auction site

Exhaust pipes are often found broken on both Kenworth and Peterbilt type cabs. With Peterbilts there are many solutions as the exhausts were standard on all versions and can be either salvaged from damaged/common Semis or tippers or even bought new from at least one dealer on the Internet. Chrome ones predominate but these can be stripped and often have black plastic underneath, which is ideal for the two military Peterbilts. If not, they can just be painted black.

Kenworth semi tractors are often found without exhausts, but original spares are not readily available. However the plastic exhausts from the Die cast Matchbox Kenworth Aerodyne, although a little large, can be carefully removed and used as substitutes. To remove them cut at the top of the curved pipe at the base of the exhaust baffle and slide down to free them from the clip. The strap that holds the two stacks together will need to be carefully removed before the stacks are glued in place.

If a Kenworth still has the original exhausts, but the tips have been lost, the other way to repair them is to carefully file the tops flat and then drill a small hole to take a new round plastic or metal tip. Care needs to be taken to ensure the new hole is drilled right in the centre of the baffle. The tops of the new tips need to be raked to match the originals.

For all Tyco exhausts and grilles the most useful tool is a Liquid Chrome pen. These are almost magical, allowing even the roughest-looking chrome finishes to be restored. They are available in various widths.

To run US-1 (and not use the original control gear), wires can be carefully soldered to the underside of the two contact strips, but given the age and condition of the track, it is recommended that as the layout size increases, the number of 'feeds' to each circuit are increased to avoid voltage drop. US-1 track has not always aged well and much found will have discolored or had minor bits broken off at the joints. To obtain the best running results, use the best track available and clean it well: Wash and scrub with a good detergent and then dry it thoroughly. Give the contact strips a rub with an abrasive track-cleaning block, (like those used for model railroads) and pay particular attention to the metal contact strips at the joints. Treatment of the metal strips with a non-damaging contact oil can be helpful, but try to avoid dripping any on the road surface.

US-1 vehicles will run on most other makes of HO slot-car track, but the Action Accessories can only be connected to Tyco US-1 track via the special US-1 Turnouts. US-1 track is a gray version of Tyco Quick Clik and this is compatible with the later Mattel track. Adaptor sections to join Quick Clik to the older Tyco Pro and Life-Like Racing tracks have been made, but only the Auto World 'Tyco Quick Clik to Tomy AFX' type appears to still be in production.

Vehicles from this range are relatively wide, so if two trucks are simultaneously run on an earlier, narrower slot-car track, like Playcraft Highways, Aurora Model Motoring or later AFX track they may collide when passing each other.

Non US-1 vehicles can be run on Trucking layouts, but lighter types like Aurora TJets can sometimes get 'beached' on the sprung copper tongues at the Turnouts, whereas Magnetic slot cars will generally cope quite well as they usually have enough 'virtual' weight to pass through them.Controllers'' The best type of controller to use is a Model Railroad 'feedback' type. These give good speed control and steady constant speed running, (resistance types of many makes have been tried but can cause erratic running). Videos exist showing the trucks being successfully run with Model Railroad Digital Command Control 'electronic chips' fitted. This is not for the faint-hearted and can also be expensive.

Any vehicle obtained will need a good clean, and the tunnel weight temporarily removed by prying the side with a small flat screwdriver. This allows the removal of fluff, which accumulates around the worm screw and rear axle. Lightly oil the motor bearings and axles and put a little silicon or PTFE grease on the gears, replace the tires if they are hardened and the pickups too, if they are 'rutted'.

The cast plate that holds pick ups into the chassis will automatically set them to correct angle as they are screwed into place. (Pre-bending them can exert too much force on the roadway, resulting in lost traction). However it is important to ensure that the folded 'retaining brackets' at the ends of the strips are free to travel up and down in their open mountings. On the Semi-Tractors ensure that the 'return' portion of these brackets does not rub against the Fifth Wheel weight, or it will stop it moving freely and may cause a short circuit.

Although the Tyco US-1 system was based on trucking within the United States, the range was widely sold in many other countries around the world. These are known to include Italy, the Netherlands, Spain, Sweden, Australia and the United Kingdom. It was probably sold in many of the countries where other Tyco products were available, too. In all markets the system sold was the same, with the trucks always travelling on the right hand side of the road and reversing back into Action Stations. Only the mains voltages/plug types of the transformers, set packaging and the instruction sheets enclosed were changed to meet local needs.

People throughout the world collect US-1 today, but the biggest market remains where the product was set - in the United States - and most of the items offered for sale on Internet auction sites are to be found there. This is also where most of the demand for US-1 still is and where most of the replica parts are made/supplied, too. Some items do come up for sale in other countries, but the range of products found outside the US is generally limited. A possible reason for this could be that the range sold outside the US was more limited than that sold 'at home'. However this must remain a theory until more non-US price lists are found and examined.

Today models and sets are bought by collectors, with many US-1 trucks are operated either at home or at public shows. Videos showing this can be found on some video apps. Some of the films show the various loading and unloading accessories in action and original commercials for the range can be found, too: Search for 'Tyco Trucking' or 'Tyco US-1'.

See also
 U.S. 1 (comics)

External links
 US-1 Trucking Resource
 Derek A Brand - Tribute Page
 History of HO Slot Car racing
 Tyco Catalogs (year by year, page by page)

Toy cars and trucks